NCS Group (also known as NCS Pte Ltd or "NCS", previously known as National Computer Systems) is a multinational information technology company headquartered in Singapore. Founded in 1981 as an agency of the Singapore government, it was privatised in 1996 and subsequently become part of the Singtel group in 1997. NCS has over 12,000 staff located in more than 20 cities across Asia Pacific.

History 
NCS was founded in 1981 when the Government of Singapore embarked upon initiatives to harness information technology (IT) for both the public and private sectors.

It was restructured as a commercial entity in 1996 and a year later, became a wholly owned subsidiary of SingTel Group. NCS adopted its current name on 1 November 2003.

SingTel Aeradio was a communication engineering services provider in airport consultancy, facility management services, engineering and radio communications, C4ISR*, intelligent building, smart security services, transportation services, IT infrastructure system, IT Security training and certification, telecommunication and multimedia.

In 2002, SingTel Aeradio merged with NCS, retaining much of its identity as NCS Communications Engineering (NCS Comms Engg).

In 2008, NCS bought 60% of local rival IT company, Singapore Computer Systems, shares, triggering a buyout of the company.

In 2020, NCS acquires digital services 2359 Media.

Management 
In 2005, Chong Yoke Sin became the Chief Executive Officer (CEO). She resigned in 2007 for personal reasons and Lim Eng took over as the CEO. 

Lim retired in 2010 and Chief Operating Officer Chia Wee Boon took over as CEO.

On 1 August 2019, the Singtel Group appointed Ng Kuo Pin as the new chief executive officer of NCS after Chia stepped down.

Products and services 
The company offers several services including consultancy, development, integration, infrastructure management, and BPO to customers from the public, education, financial services, insurance, healthcare, life sciences, logistics, telecommunications, utilities and transportation sectors.

Incidents

Community Health Assist Scheme computer system error 

On 16 February 2019, the MOH released statement that there was an error in the computer system, managed by NCS Group, for the Community Health Assist Scheme (CHAS). Remedial actions were then carried out by MOH and NCS Group to assess impact on the affected applicants. MOH reportedly had the intention to recover costs and expenses due to this incident from NCS Group as allowed in the contract between them.

Workers protest at NCS Hub entrance 
On 18 October 2022, 9  foreign workers blocked the main entrance of NCS Hub, the company's headquarter in Singapore, and holding up signs protesting against the contractor company they work under for owing salary. Some workers holding signs written "欠債還錢" (owe money pay money) and one of them holds "上海忠記私人有限公司" (Shanghai Chong Kee Pte Ltd). The Singapore Police Force received call for assistance at around 1.50pm and deploy officers to NCS Hub's entrance, the Ministry of Manpower confirms received alerts to the incident by the police. The NCS Group told the Singapore news media, Lianhe Zaobao, that this incident has nothing to do with NCS Group and claimed that it's a conflict between NCS Group's main contractor Shanghai Chong Kee Pte Ltd, and sub-contractor Zhengda Corporation, and the 9 workers who protested are employees under Zhengda Corporation. According to Zhengda Corporation, Shanghai Chong Kee did not make payment for weeks. The latter has since issued two cheques.

References 

1981 establishments in Singapore
International information technology consulting firms
Business process outsourcing companies
Information technology companies of Singapore
Singaporean companies established in 1981
Companies established in 1981